Kim Bong-han (born 1916) was a North Korean medical surgeon at Pyongyang Medical University and Kyung-Rak institute (KRI). He is primarily known for his research on a proposed mechanism for acupuncture that was not accepted by the mainstream medical community that has come to be called the "primo-vascular system". He received the People's Prize for his research. The primo-vascular system was claimed to be scientifically confirmed in 2002, but the matter remains controversial. In 1966, the Kyung-Rak institute was closed and Kim disappeared.

Early life and education
Kim Bong-han was born in 1916. He obtained his medical degree from Seoul National University in 1946. After the Korean War broke out, Kim, who was a physiologist based in South Korea, crossed over to North Korea, leaving his family behind. Prior to his arrival in North Korea, Kim was affiliated with the Korea Democratic Party.

Primo-vascular system
Kim claimed the existence of the  Chin-Lo, Kyungrak, or Bonghan system,  a system of pathways which he proposed form a basis for acupuncture points and meridians. In 2010, South Korean researchers recognized the same system as the "primo-vascular system". There is no credible scientific evidence that these structures exist, however.

While working as director of North Korea's Kyung-Rak institute (KRI) from 1962 to 1965, Kim published five articles in the Journal of Jo Sun Medicine, about acupuncture, the Kyungrak system, and the "Sanal" theory. These articles form the basis of the proposed primo-vascular system, which attracted some interest as late as in the early 2010s. 

The North Korean government supported Kim's research by supplying his team with various analytical instruments such as microscopes and radioactive tracers, most of which were imported from Eastern Europe. He was awarded the People's Prize for his work on 2 February 1962. Kim's book On the Kyungrak system was originally simultaneously published in Korean and Chinese languages in 1963.

Disappearance
In 1966, the Kyung-Rak research institute was shut down. , Kim's whereabouts thereafter remain unknown.

Works

See also
List of people who disappeared
Traditional Korean medicine

References

Further reading
 
 

1916 births
Possibly living people
Date of birth missing (living people)
Place of birth missing (living people)
1960s missing person cases
20th-century North Korean scientists
Acupuncturists
Missing people
North Korean scientists
Seoul National University alumni
South Korean defectors
South Korean emigrants to North Korea